São Paulo (Portuguese for Saint Paul) is the capital city of the state of São Paulo in Brazil.

São Paulo may also refer to:

Places
 São Paulo (state), one of the states of Brazil
 Greater São Paulo, the São Paulo region's urban and outlying urban areas
 The Saint Peter and Saint Paul Archipelago belonging to Brazil
 São Paulo das Missões, a municipality in the state of Rio Grande do Sul, Brazil
 São Paulo de Olivença, a municipality in the state of Amazonas, Brazil
 São Paulo (Lisbon), a freguesia (civil parish) of Lisbon, Portugal
 Luanda, the capital of Angola, formerly named São Paulo da Assunção de Loanda

Sports
 São Paulo Futebol Clube, a Brazilian football team
 São Paulo Futebol Clube (AP), a Brazilian football team
 São Paulo Athletic Club, a defunct Brazilian football team founded by Charles Miller
 Sport Club São Paulo, a Brazilian football team
 Estádio Universitário São Paulo, a Brazilian football stadium
 Campo de São Paulo, an Angolan football stadium

Ships
 NAe São Paulo, aircraft carrier and former flagship of the Brazilian Navy, scuttled in 2023
 Brazilian battleship São Paulo, dreadnought of the Brazilian Navy, sank in 1951

In music
 "São Paulo", a song by English rock band Guillemots which closes their 2006 debut album, Through the Windowpane
 "São Paulo", a song by American disco/funk band Chic from their self-titled album
 "São Paulo", a song by British trip hop band Morcheeba from their 2002 album Charango

See also
 Saint Paul, Minnesota
 Saint Paul (disambiguation) (persons)